...Aval! is a 1972 Indian Tamil-language erotic drama film written and directed by A. C. Tirulokchandar, produced by Vijayalakshmi Pictures and presented by Nahatha Pictures. A remake of the 1971 Hindi film Do Raha, it stars V. Nirmala, A. V. M. Rajan, Srikanth and Sasikumar. The film was released on 15 September 1972, and became a commercial success.

Plot 

Geetha, the daughter of a millionaire, falls in love with Chandranath, a writer. Both have sex before marriage and they get married against the wishes of Geetha's father. Sadanandh, a rich publisher who lusts for Geetha, makes Chandranath rich. Chandranath takes to drinking, induces Geetha to drink and a drunk Sadanandh has sex with her; she is traumatised the next morning on learning of what happened. Later when Sadanandh tries to rape Geetha, he is shot dead by an unseen man. Geetha is tried and falsely accepts responsibility, but Chandranath claims responsibility to save her. Soon after, Chandranath's friend Prakash arrives and reveals himself as the real killer. Despite being exonerated, Geetha later commits suicide to purge herself of all she has been through.

Cast

Production 
The Hindi film Do Raha (1971) was a "sensational success", prompting A. C. Tirulokchandar to remake it in Tamil with the title ...Aval!. Besides directing, he also wrote the remake's screenplay, while the dialogues were written by A. L. Narayanan.

Themes 
Writing for Bangalore Mirror, R. S. Prakash considered ...Aval! to be one of the earliest Tamil films based entirely on sex.

Soundtrack 
The soundtrack was composed by Shankar–Ganesh, while the lyrics were written by Vaali.

Release 
...Aval! was released on 15 September 1972, and was presented by Nahatha Pictures. Like the original Hindi film, this too attained commercial success, and became one of the most popular films starring Nirmala.

References

Bibliography

External links 
 

1970s erotic drama films
1970s Tamil-language films
1972 drama films
1972 films
Films directed by A. C. Tirulokchandar
Films scored by Shankar–Ganesh
Indian erotic drama films
Tamil remakes of Hindi films